USS Wyman (DE-38) was an  of the United States Navy during World War II. She was promptly sent off into the Pacific Ocean to protect convoys and other ships from Japanese submarines and fighter aircraft. She performed dangerous work, including participating in the sinking of two Japanese submarines, and was awarded six battle stars.

She was originally laid down as BDE-38 on 7 September 1942 at Bremerton, Washington, by the Puget Sound Navy Yard for the Royal Navy; launched on 3 June 1943; and sponsored by Mrs. Joe L. April. However, the ship's transfer to the United Kingdom was canceled. The destroyer escort was designated DE-38 on 16 June; named Wyman on the 23rd; and was commissioned at the Puget Sound Navy Yard on 1 September 1943, Lt. Comdr. Robert W. Copeland, USNR, in command.

Namesake
Eldon P. Wyman was born on 11 January 1917 in Portland, Oregon. He attended the University of Oregon from 1936 to 1940, before enlisting in the United States Naval Reserve as an apprentice seaman on 22 August 1940 at Portland. The Oklahoma subsequently operated out of Pearl Harbor as a unit of Battleship Division 1 on exercises in the Hawaiian operating area and off the west coast as tensions increased in the Pacific and in the Far East. By early December 1941, Wyman was serving as junior watch officer of the ship's "F" (fire control) division.

During the attack on Pearl Harbor the Oklahoma was hit by four aerial torpedoes and rolled over at her berth; among those trapped within the ship's hull was Wyman.

On 4 September 2008 the Defense Prisoner of War/Missing Personnel Office announced the remains of Wyman and two other seamen had been identified.

World War II Pacific Theatre operations
Following shakedown, Wyman departed Puget Sound on 7 November, bound for Hawaii, and arrived at Pearl Harbor on the 14th. Assigned to duty with Submarines, Pacific Fleet, the destroyer escort operated out of Pearl Harbor on submarine exercises from 1 December 1943 through the spring of 1944.

Anti-submarine operations
Detached from this duty on 22 June 1944, Wyman sailed for the Marshall Islands and began anti-submarine warfare (ASW) operations in the American convoy routes between Eniwetok and Saipan. Wyman fired one barrage of depth charge bombs from her "hedgehog" but did not come up with evidence that she had either damaged or destroyed her enemy.
 
She remained in the area from 12 to 18 July before proceeding to investigate a surface radar contact at 0024 on the 19th. The destroyer escort closed the range until she lost radar contact at 0045 and switched immediately to her sonar. Wyman picked up a strong metallic echo and, at 0051, fired a full pattern of "hedgehog" projectiles, with negative results. She reloaded, opened the range, and then closed for a second attack, as  closed in the meantime.

Sinking of the Japanese Submarine Ro-48
At 01:25, Wyman launched a second full pattern from her hedgehog – dead on the target. A series of violent explosions rocked the destroyer escort, as the depth bombs blew the submarine apart. Wyman circled to starboard and passed through her own firing point in order to regain contact but picked up only a "mush" echo – indicative that her contact had been destroyed. Remaining on the scene of the action, Wyman lowered a motor whaleboat to recover oil samples from the water and to fish out debris. In the large, spreading, oil slick, men in the boat picked up two five-gallon oil cans, one small gasoline can, and a piece of teak wood.

Attacked by friendly forces
As it was gathering this materiel, Wyman's motor whaler was strafed by two planes from Hoggatt Bay, whose pilots had mistaken the boat for a surfaced submarine. (According to my father who was on the motor launch, Wyman's captain broke radio silence and informed the Hoggatt Bay, that if their planes made another pass on his men, the Wyman would "open fire" on them.) There were no fatalities, and the injured men were soon transferred to Hoggatt Bay for medical treatment. Oil from the sunken submarine – later identified by a post-war examination of Japanese records as  – continued to bubble up in copious quantities into the next day. Satisfied that the kill was definite, Wyman rejoined TG 12.2 and arrived at Eniwetok on 22 July.

Sinking of Japanese submarine I-55
Her respite was short, however, for she again got underway on 26 July. Two days later, at 1733, lookouts in Hoggatt Bay and Wyman simultaneously spotted the  running on the surface. Wyman and Reynolds charged after the enemy submersible as she went deep in an effort to escape. Wyman picked up the fleeing I-boat by sonar at 1805. Eight minutes later, the destroyer escort fired a "hedgehog" pattern which struck its target with deadly accuracy. Wyman's sound operators heard the sounds of heavy explosions from beneath the sea as I-55 began to blow apart. While opening the range at 1819, a further set of explosions rocked the sea, sounding the death knell for the enemy I-boat. Reynolds then added a "hedgehog" pattern, but her target had already perished. Large quantities of debris and oil, visible evidence of Wyman's second "kill", soon came to the surface.

Return to escort duty
With the dissolution of TG 12.2 on 9 August, Wyman joined TG 57.3 for escort duty in waters between the Marshalls and Marianas. On 31 August, the destroyer escort escorted fuel ships of Task Unit 30.8.10 to a rendezvous with TG 38.4 and back to link up with TG 38.2 and Task Force 34. After completing this mission on 20 October 1944, the day of the first landings in the Philippine Islands, Wyman resumed escort operations between the Marshalls and Marianas and also participated in hunter-killer operations into early 1945, supporting the invasion of the strategic island of Iwo Jima.

Supporting Okinawa operations
She departed from Ulithi on 13 March 1945 and proceeded to the fueling area for TG 50.8 for duty as escort with the Logistics Support Group for the invasion of Okinawa. During this tour of duty, which lasted into the spring of 1945, she sank three floating Japanese mines by gunfire.

Post-War activity
The destroyer escort remained with the 5th Fleet until 10 June, continuing her unglamorous but vital role, screening the important convoys bringing men and munitions to the war zone for the drive against the Japanese homeland. After a stop at Guam, Wyman headed for the United States, proceeding via Pearl Harbor and Eniwetok, and arrived at San Francisco, California, on 15 July.

End of War decommissioning
The end of the war changed the Navy's plans for the ship. On 17 August – while in the midst of her scheduled 42-day overhaul during which she was to receive her "ultimate approved armament" (This armament was to be a large deck gun to be fitted to the Wyman for the purpose of grounding the Wyman on the Japanese coast and shelling the Japanese mainland in preparation for the invasion of American Marines.  Crew were told to get their affairs in order while on leave.  The crew was to report back to the ship to prepare for the invasion which never happened.  The atom bomb ended those plans and the Wyman crew never sailed again.)– all work on the ship "except that necessary to place the ship in safe and habitable condition" was halted. Declared surplus to the needs of the postwar Navy, Wyman was decommissioned on 17 December 1945 and struck from the Navy List on 8 January 1946.
 
Having been stripped prior to her decommissioning, the ship's hulk was sold to the National Metal and Steel Company, of Terminal Island, California, on 16 April 1947 for scrapping, a process which was completed by 14 March 1948.

Awards

Notes

References

External links

 

 

Evarts-class destroyer escorts
Ships built in Bremerton, Washington
1943 ships
World War II frigates and destroyer escorts of the United States